The 1987 Giro d'Italia was the 70th edition of the bicycle race. It began on 21 May with a  prologue in San Remo, and concluded on 13 June with a  individual time trial in Saint-Vincent. A total of 180 riders from 20 teams entered the 22-stage, -long race, which was won by Irishman Stephen Roche of the  team. Second and third places were taken by British rider Robert Millar and Dutchman Erik Breukink, respectively. It was the second time in the history of the Giro that the podium was occupied solely by non-Italian riders. Roche's victory in the 1987 Giro was his first step in completing the Triple Crown of Cycling – winning the Giro d'Italia, the Tour de France, and the World Championship road race in one calendar year – becoming the second rider ever to do so.

Roche's teammate and defending champion Roberto Visentini took the first race leader's maglia rosa after winning the opening prologue, only to lose it to Breukink the following stage. Roche took the overall lead after his team, Carrera Jeans–Vagabond, won the stage three team time trial. Visentini regained the lead for a two-day period after the stage 13 individual time trial. The fifteenth stage of the 1987 Giro has been recognized as an iconic event in the history of the race because Roche rode ahead of teammate Visentini, despite orders from the team management, and took the race lead. Roche successfully defended the overall lead from attacks by Visentini and other general classification contenders until the event's finish in Saint-Vincent.

Stephen Roche became the first Irishman to win the Giro d'Italia. In addition to the general classification, Roche also won the combination classification. In the other race classifications, Johan van der Velde of Gis Gelati–Jollyscarpe won the points classification, Robert Millar of  took the mountains classification green jersey, and Selca–Conti's Roberto Conti completed the Giro as the best neo-professional in the general classification, finishing fifteenth overall. Panasonic–Isostar finished as the winners of the team classification, which ranks each of the twenty teams contesting the race by lowest cumulative time.

Teams

A total of 20 teams were invited to participate in the 1987 Giro d'Italia. Each team sent a squad of nine riders, which meant that the race started with a peloton of 180 cyclists. The starting peloton featured riders from 17 different countries. Italy (91), the Netherlands (16), Spain (15), Belgium (13), Switzerland (10), and France (10) all had more than 10 or more riders.

Of those starting, 74 were riding the Giro d'Italia for the first time. The presentation of the teams – where each team's roster and manager are introduced in front of the media and local dignitaries – took place on 20 May, outside the Casino of San Remo. From the riders that began this edition, 133 completed the race.

The teams entering the race were:

Pre-race favorites

Reigning champion Roberto Visentini returned to the race in 1987 to defend his crown, despite not winning many races in his spring campaign. Francesco Moser, who won in 1984 and finished in the top three in 1985 and 1986, did not participate because of a head trauma and bruises sustained in a crash in the weeks prior to the race. Spanish sports newspaper El Mundo Deportivo and Gian Paolo Ormezzano from Italy's La Stampa named several other riders as contenders for the overall classification, such as Giuseppe Saronni, then-world champion Moreno Argentin, Stephen Roche, and Robert Millar. Since  team leader Greg LeMond did not participate in the race due to injuries sustained in a hunting accident, El Mundo Deportivo believed Jean-François Bernard to be a dark horse. L'Unità writer Gino Sala believed Roche, Saronni, and Visentini were the top three challengers for the overall crown.

Climbers Gianbattista Baronchelli, Éric Caritoux, Franco Chioccioli, Marino Lejarreta, and Millar were expected to contend for mountains classification. Several writers felt Argentin, Guido Bontempi, Urs Freuler, Eddy Planckaert, and Paolo Rosola all had a great chance to win a stage in the race. Mario Fossati of La Repubblica also thought that Bernard, Bontempi, and Phil Anderson could take a stage win. Anderson returned to cycling at the Giro following a lengthy battle with a virus. Due to Rolf Sørensen's victory at the Tirreno–Adriatico he was seen as an outside contender, but there were questions over his ability to climb in the high mountains.

There was a strong belief that the race would be a battle between Carrera Jeans–Vagabond teammates Visentini and Roche. El Mundo Deportivo stated that Visentini had the edge in the time trial discipline and sprinting, while Roche had the advantage in climbing mountains. However, unlike Visentini, Roche came into the race in great shape after winning the Tour de Romandie and placing second in the Liège–Bastogne–Liège and the Critérium International. Cycling expert and author Bill McGann thought that the race would be disputed between Visentini and Baronchelli.

Route and stages 

The route for the 1987 edition of the Giro d'Italia was revealed to the public on television by head organizer Vincenzo Torriani on 21 February 1987. The course featured a total of  climbing,  more than the previous edition. Five of these thirteen stages had summit finishes: stage 1a, to San Romolo; stage 6, to Monte Terminillo; stage 15, to Sappada; stage 19, to Madesimo; and stage 21, to Pila. Another stage with a mountain-top finish was stage 13, which consisted of a climbing time trial to San Marino. The organizers chose to include one rest day between stages 10 and 11. When compared to the previous Giro, the race had the same number of stages – although one stage consisted of two half-stages – but was  longer and contained an additional individual time trial. The sixteenth stage, which ran from Sappada to Canazei, was named the queen stage for its five categorized climbs.

Race director Torriani was happy with the success the 1985 Giro d'Italia had when passing through the Aosta Valley and chose to include this mountainous region, which lies adjacent to the Rhône-Alpes, in the 1987 route. With the Giro's return to the valley, La Stampa and the regional cycling federation director, Maggiorino Ferrero, speculated that the stages taking place in this region would be critical in deciding the general classification. Carlo Champvillair, a climbing champion of Aosta Valley, believed it to be a well-constructed, technical race route. The time trial in San Marino, the sixth stage with the finish atop Monte Terminillo, and the stages including the Dolomites were seen by L'Unità writer Gino Sala as stages that would heavily influence the general classification. In addition, he said that the route was suited to well-rounded, strong, and durable riders. The prologue contained a descent of the Poggio, a mountain used frequently in the Milan–San Remo, and was considered dangerous by some critics. However, Torriani decided to include the descent.

Race overview

The Giro began with a  prologue through the streets of San Remo. The returning winner of the Giro, Roberto Visentini, won the prologue by two tenths of a second over the Canadian rider Steve Bauer. The next race day held two stages: a  stage with a summit finish, followed by a downhill individual time trial. 's Erik Breukink took the climbing half-stage win with a solo attack. His performance earned him the race leader's maglia rosa, which he kept until the third stage. Stephen Roche won the time trial half-stage with a three-second margin over Del Tongo's Lech Piasecki. The main field remained intact for the remaining kilometers and the race geared up for a sprint finish won by Moreno Argentin.

In addition to the stage victory, Carrera Jeans–Vagabond's Roche took the overall lead. The fifth stage was relatively flat and was used to set up the race to enter the Apennine Mountains the following day. The leg culminated in a mass sprint that was won by Panasonic–Isostar's Belgian rider Eddy Planckaert, after overcoming Paolo Rosola in the closing meters.

Roche defended his race lead until stage thirteen, a  climbing individual time trial to Monte Titano in San Marino, where he lost the pink jersey to his teammate and stage winner Visentini. Roche claimed his performance in the stage was hampered due to injuries sustained from a crash in the tenth stage. At , the fourteenth stage was the longest of the race. It was won in a mass sprint by Remac Fanini's Paolo Cimini, who overtook Rosola in the final meters.

The fifteenth stage saw the race enter the Dolomites and traverse three major climbs within the mountain chain. On the descent of the Monte Rest, Roche formed a leading group with two other riders after speeding away from the race leader's group. Despite orders from his team management, Roche continued with the move. The Carrera Jeans-Vagabond pack chased after the Roche group to protect the advantage of Roche's teammate and race leader Visentini. Roche crossed the finish line in twelfth place, fifty-six seconds after the stage winner van der Velde, which allowed him to don again the pink jersey by five seconds over Tony Rominger. Roche's actions, taking the race lead away from Visentini and disobeying team commands, gained him the hatred of the Italian cycling fans.

The sixteenth leg of the race included five categorized climbs before concluding in the municipality of Canazei. On the descent of the Pordoi Pass, van der Velde broke away and caught up to the leader on the road before winning his second consecutive stage. Meanwhile, behind van der Velde, Visentini tried several times to attack Roche on the slopes of the Passo Fedaia; however, Roche marked all of his moves and the two raced to the finish in the same group. Stage 17, the race's final day in the Dolomites, was marred by poor weather. A breakaway group of three was given a significant gap as the main general classification contenders rode behind in a collective group. Atala Ofmega's Italian rider Marco Vitali out-sprinted his two fellow breakaway members to win his first Grand Tour stage win.

As the eighteenth stage began, the peloton felt they deserved a rest day after three difficult stages in the Dolomites and collectively rode at a non-aggressive pace for over three-quarters of the stage. During the nineteenth stage, Jean-François Bernard launched an attack after the leading group finished the climb of the San Marco Pass. Three riders joined Bernard before the start of the final climb in Madesimo, but Bernard dropped them early on in the climb and rode the final  alone to win the stage. Millar and Lejarreta managed to gain over thirty seconds on Roche after they attacked on the final climb. Despite a crash within the final kilometer of stage twenty, the main field managed to hold a bunch sprint that was won by Rosola.

In the twenty-first leg, the general classification contenders were a part of the same leading group until the final climb to the summit finish in Pila. Lejarreta attacked  from the finish and only seven other riders were able to mark, including Millar and Roche. Over  later, the Spaniard attacked again and only Roche and Millar remained with him. Despite further attacks by Lejarreta, the group rode together up to the finish. Millar's performance on the stay brought him to second place overall. The final stage of the 1987 Giro d'Italia was a  individual time trial. Visentini, who had crashed in the previous stage, did not start and abandoned the race. Roche beat out the second-place finisher, Dietrich Thurau, by fourteen seconds to win the day and the overall race itself. In doing so, Roche became the first Irishman to win the Giro d'Italia. The other podium positions were filled by non-Italian riders for the second time in the history of the race.

Four riders achieved multiple stage victories: Argentin (stages 2, 4, and 7), Rosola (stages 8, 10, and 20), Visentini (prologue and stage 13), and Roche (stages 1b and 22). Stage wins were achieved by seven of the twenty competing squads, five of which won multiple stages. Gewiss-Bianchi collected a total of six stage wins through two riders, Argentin and Rosola. Carrera Jeans-Vagabond achieved the same feat with individual stage wins from Bontempi (stage 12), Roche and Visentini (two wins each), and a team time trial win (stage 3). Panasonic–Isostar amassed a total of three stage victories through Breukink (stage 1a), Planckaert (stage 5), and Millar (stage 21). Atala-Ofmega also secured three stage wins, through Freuler (stage 9), Vitali (stage 17), and Calcaterra (stage 18). Gis Gelati–Jollyscarpe won two stages with van der Velde (stages 15 and 16). Fagor–MBK also collected two stage successes, with Jean-Claude Bagot (stage 6) and Robert Forest (stage 11). Remac–Fanini and Toshiba–Look both won a single stage at the Giro, the first through Cimini (stage 14), and the second through Bernard (stage 19).

Classification leadership

Four different jerseys were worn during the 1987 Giro d'Italia. The leader of the general classification – calculated by adding the stage finish times of each rider, and allowing time bonuses for the first three finishers on mass-start stages – wore a pink jersey. The time bonuses for the 1987 Giro were twenty seconds for the first place, fifteen seconds for the second place, ten seconds for the third place, and five seconds for the fourth place on the stage. This classification is the most important of the race, and its winner is considered to be the winner of the Giro.

For the points classification, which awarded a purple (or cyclamen) jersey to its leader, cyclists were given points for finishing a stage in the top 15; additional points could also be won in intermediate sprints. The green jersey was awarded to the mountains classification leader. In this ranking, points were won by reaching the summit of a climb ahead of other cyclists. Each climb was ranked as either first, second or third category, with more points available for higher category climbs. The Cima Coppi, the race's highest point of elevation, awarded more points than the other first category climbs. The Cima Coppi for this edition of the Giro was the Passo Pordoi, and the first rider to cross it was Fagor–MBK's Jean-Claude Bagot. The white jersey was worn by the leader of young rider classification, a ranking decided the same way as the general classification, but considering only neo-professional cyclists (in their first three years of professional racing). Although no jersey was awarded, there was also one classification for the teams, in which the stage finish times of the best three cyclists per team were added; the leading team was the one with the lowest total time.

Final standings

General classification

Points classification

Mountains classification

Young rider classification

Combination classification

Traguardi Fiat Uno classification

Vola al cinema classification

Intermediate sprints classification

Team classification

Aftermath

Upon completing the final stage, Roche told the media that by winning the final time trial he felt he silenced any critics who doubted whether he should have won the race. In addition, Roche announced his intention to compete in the Tour de France in July. He won the Tour with a margin of forty seconds over the second-place finisher and thus became the fifth rider to win the Giro and Tour in the same year. In September, Roche won the men's road race at the 1987 UCI Road World Championships and became the second rider to achieve the Triple Crown of Cycling, which consists of winning two Grand Tour races and the men's road race at the UCI Road World Championships in a calendar year. For his career successes in the Giro d'Italia, Roche was inducted into the race's Hall of Fame in 2014. After dropping out of the 1987 edition of the Giro, Visentini did not win any further stages or classifications in major races, and retired from cycling in 1990, at the age of 33.

La Repubblica stated that the Italian riders had the second worst performance in the history of the Giro after 1972, since none finished inside the top four and many famous Italian cyclists failed to complete the race. Mario Fossati, of La Repubblica, thought that van der Velde and Bernard performed very strongly, along with Argentin, who he said was operating on "alternating current". Fossati also said that Cimini and Calcaterra could have promising careers, based on their efforts during the race.

The 1987 Giro has become famous for the series of events involving teammates Roche and Visentini. Many writers highlight the fifteenth stage as the defining moment of the race. The Corriere delle Alpi and cycling book author Bill McGann even named it as one of the most famous in the Giro d'Italia and cycling history. On that day, Roche – who was second in the general classification and over two minutes behind race leader Visentini – attacked the lead, despite orders from his team to stop. Upon completing the stage, Visentini told the press that either Roche or himself would not start the following day, while Roche independently held a press conference from his hotel and answered questions. Carrera Jeans-Vagabond manager David Boifava ordered Roche and Visentini to stay silent. The following day, many Italian newspapers called Roche a betrayer or cheat for his actions. Despite Visentini's statement, both riders started the sixteenth stage after receiving orders from Carrera company boss Tito Tachella. In the days that followed, Italian fans threw things and spat at Roche, which led him to receive police protection until the race's conclusion. Looking back on the incident, Roche claimed that he just descended the mountain quicker than Visentini and did nothing wrong, while Visentini maintained that Roche attacked him when he should have been aiding him. Visentini accused Roche of dashing the team's morale and strategy, but some critics believed that Roche's actions were acceptable because he was the stronger rider.

References

Citations

Bibliography

 

 
1987
Giro d'Italia
Giro d'Italia
May 1987 sports events in Europe
June 1987 sports events in Europe
1987 Super Prestige Pernod International